Saint Gabriel  may refer to:
 Gabriel, archangel
 Gabriel of Beth Qustan (574-668)
 Gabriel Lallemant (1610–1649), a Jesuit missionary and Canadian Martyr
 Patriarch Gabriel II of Constantinople, known also as New Hieromartyr Gabriel, Metropolitan of Prousa, died 1659
 Gabriel of Belostok (†1690), April 20 / May 3
 Gabriel of Our Lady of Sorrows (1838–1862), a Passionist clerical student
 Gabriel (Urgebadze) (1929–1995), Georgian Orthodox saint

Places

In Canada
 Saint-Gabriel, Quebec
 Saint-Gabriel-Lalemant, Quebec
 Saint-Gabriel-de-Brandon, Quebec
 Saint-Gabriel-de-Rimouski, Quebec, known simply as Saint-Gabriel before 1998
 Saint-Gabriel-de-Valcartier

In France
 Saint-Gabriel-Brécy, a commune in the department of Calvados
 Saint-Gabriel (ancient Ernaginum), a hamlet within the commune of Tarascon, in southern France

In the United States
 St. Gabriel, Louisiana

In Turkey
 Mor Gabriel Monastery, the oldest surviving Syriac Orthodox monastery in the world near Midyat

Institutions
 Auberge Le Saint-Gabriel, the oldest inn in North America, located in Montreal, Canada
 Saint Gabriel's College, a private Catholic school located in Bangkok, Thailand
 Saint Gabriel's School, a school in Santiago de Chile, Chile
 Saint Gabriel's Secondary School, an all-boys Catholic secondary school in Singapore
 Saint Gabriel International School, a Chinese educational institution in Pasig, Philippines
 St. Gabriel's Church (disambiguation)

See also
 Gabriel (disambiguation)
 San Gabriel (disambiguation) - Spanish spelling of Saint Gabriel